Below is a list of squads at the FIBA World Olympic Qualifying Tournament for Men 2008:

Brazil
Coach :   Moncho Monsalve

Cameroon
Coach :   Lazare Adingono

Canada
Coach :   Leo Rautins

Cape Verde
Coach :   Eric Silva

Croatia
Coach :   Jasmin Repeša

Germany
Coach :   Dirk Bauermann

Greece
Coach :   Panagiotis Giannakis

Korea
Coach :   Kim Nam-Gi

Lebanon
Coach :   Fuad Abou Chakra

New Zealand
Coach :   Nenad Vucinic

Puerto Rico
Coach :   Manolo Cintron

Slovenia
Coach :   Aleš Pipan

References

Source

squad
Qual